Live at the Royal Festival Hall is the third live album by American singer-songwriter Glen Campbell, released in November 1977 by Capitol Records.

Track listing
Side 1
 "Stars / Rhinestone Cowboy" (Janis Ian / Larry Weiss) – 6:14
 "Dreams of the Everyday Housewife" (Chris Gantry) – 2:03
 "(Let Me Be Your) Teddy Bear (Kal Mann, Bernie Lowe) / Loving You" (Jerry Leiber, Mike Stoller) – 4:55
 "Streets of London" (Ralph McTell) – 3:02
 "Try a Little Kindness" (Bobby Austin, Curt Sapaugh) – 1:58
 
Side 2
 "Southern Nights" (Allen Toussaint) – 3:16
 "Good Vibrations/Help Me Rhonda/Surfer Girl/Surfin' U.S.A." (Brian Wilson, Mike Love, Chuck Berry) – 5:26
 "God Only Knows" (Brian Wilson, Tony Asher) – 2:59 
 "If You Go Away" (Jacques Brel, Rod McKuen) – 3:23
 "Sunflower" (Neil Diamond) – 2:51
 
Side 3
 "By The Time I Get To Phoenix" (Jimmy Webb) – 2:51
 "Galveston" (Jimmy Webb) – 3:05
 "Wichita Lineman" (Jimmy Webb) – 2:47
 "MacArthur Park" (Jimmy Webb) – 7:00
 "This is Sarah's Song" (Jimmy Webb) – 2:22
 
Side 4
 "Classical Gas" (Mason Williams) – 2:41
 "William Tell Overture" (Gioachino Rossini) – 2:34
 "[[Soliloquy (song)|Soliloquy from Carousel]]" (Richard Rodgers, Oscar Hammerstein II) – 7:12
 "That's When The Music Takes Me" (Neil Sedaka) – 2:46
 "Amazing Grace" (John Newton) – 3:51

Personnel
Music
 Glen Campbell – vocals, acoustic guitars and electric guitars, bagpipes
 George Green – drums
 Carl Jackson – acoustic guitars and electric guitars, banjo
 T.J. Kuenster – piano
 Bill McCubbin – bass guitar
 Fred Tackett – acoustic guitar
 Billie Barnum, Ann White, Stephanie Spruill – background vocals
 The Royal Philharmonic Orchestra

Production
 Glen Campbell – producer
 Gary Klein – producer
 Armin Steiner – engineer
 Alyn Ainsworth – conductor
 Jimmy Webb – conductor
 Roy Kohara – art direction 
 Brian McLaughlin – photography

Charts
Album - Billboard (United States)

References

1977 live albums
Albums recorded at the Royal Festival Hall
Glen Campbell live albums
Albums conducted by Jimmy Webb
Albums produced by Gary Klein (producer)
Capitol Records live albums